Atheneum Books was a New York City publishing house established in 1959 by Alfred A. Knopf, Jr., Simon Michael Bessie and Hiram Haydn. Simon & Schuster has owned Atheneum properties since its acquisition of Macmillan in 1994 and it created Atheneum Books for Young Readers as an imprint for children's books in the 2000s.

History

Alfred A. Knopf, Jr. left his family publishing house Alfred A. Knopf and created Atheneum Books in 1959 with Simon Michael Bessie (Harpers) and Hiram Haydn (Random House).
It became the publisher of Pulitzer Prize winners Edward Albee, Charles Johnson, James Merrill, Nikki Giovanni, Mona Van Duyn and Theodore H. White. It also published Ernest Gaines' first book Catherine Carmier (1964). 
Knopf personally recruited editor Jean E. Karl to establish a Children's Book Department in 1961. Atheneum acquired the reprint house Russell & Russell in 1965.

Atheneum merged with Charles Scribner's Sons to become The Scribner Book Company in 1978. The acquisition included Rawson Associates. Scribner was acquired by Macmillan in 1984. Macmillan was purchased by Simon & Schuster in 1994. After the merger, the Atheneum adult list was merged into Scribner and the Scribner children's line was merged into Atheneum.

In the 2000s, the Simon & Schuster imprint Atheneum Books for Young Readers has published the popular May Bird fantasy series for young adults, inaugurated by May Bird and the Ever After (2005), and the Olivia series of picture books featuring Olivia the pig (from 2000). The Higher Power of Lucky won the 2007 Newbery Medal. In a 2007 online poll, the National Education Association listed Bunnicula: A Rabbit-Tale of Mystery as one of its Teachers' Top 100 Books for Children.

Notes

References

External links
 Atheneum Books for Young Readers imprint at publisher Simon & Schuster

Book publishing companies based in New York (state)
Book publishing company imprints
Children's book publishers
Fantasy book publishers
Simon & Schuster
American companies established in 1959
Publishing companies established in 1959
1959 establishments in New York City
1984 mergers and acquisitions
1994 mergers and acquisitions